Paramelisa lophuroides is a moth of the  family Erebidae. It was described by Oberthür in 1911. It is found in Angola and Cameroon.

References

Syntomini
Moths described in 1911
Erebid moths of Africa